The Swiss women's national ice hockey team represents Switzerland at the International Ice Hockey Federation's IIHF World Women's Championships. The women's national team is controlled by the Schweizerischer Eishockeyverband. Switzerland is currently ranked 4th in the world in women's ice hockey.

Tournament record

Olympic Games
2006 – Finished in 7th place
2010 – Finished in 5th place
2014 –  Won Bronze Medal
2018 – Finished in 5th place
2022 – Finished in 4th place

World Championship
1990 – Finished in 5th place
1992 – Finished in 8th place
1994 – Finished in 7th place
1997 – Finished in 7th place
1999 – Finished in 8th place (Demoted to Division I)
2000 – Finished in 10th place (2nd in Division I)
2001 – Finished in 9th place (1st in Division I, Promoted to Top Division)
2004 – Finished in 8th place (Demoted to Division I)
2005 – Finished in 9th place (1st in Division I, Promoted to Top Division)
2007 – Finished in 5th place
2008 – Finished in 4th place
2009 – Finished in 7th place
2011 – Finished in 6th place
2012 –  Won Bronze Medal
2013 – Finished in 6th place
2015 – Finished in 6th place
2016 – Finished in 7th place
2017 – Finished in 7th place
2019 – Finished in 5th place
2020 – Cancelled due to the COVID-19 pandemic
2021 – Finished in 4th place
2022 – Finished in 4th place

European Championship
1989 – Finished in 5th place
1991 – Finished in 5th place
1993 – Finished in 5th place
1995 –  Won Bronze Medal
1996 – Finished in 5th place

Current roster
Roster for the 2022 IIHF Women's World Championship.

Head coach: Colin Muller

References

External links

IIHF profile

 
Ice hockey women
Women's national ice hockey teams in Europe
1987 establishments in Switzerland
National team